The 2017 Kobalt 400 was a Monster Energy NASCAR Cup Series race that was held on March 12, 2017, at Las Vegas Motor Speedway in Las Vegas. Contested over 267 laps on the  asphalt intermediate speedway, it was the third race of the 2017 Monster Energy NASCAR Cup Series season.

Report

Background

Las Vegas Motor Speedway, located in Clark County, Nevada outside the Las Vegas city limits and about 15 miles northeast of the Las Vegas Strip, is a  complex of multiple tracks for motorsports racing. The complex is owned by Speedway Motorsports, Inc., which is headquartered in Charlotte, North Carolina.

Entry list

First practice

Qualifying

When asked how he accomplished this despite missing his mark in Turns 1 and 2 on his pole lap, he said he didn't "know what the answer is. I'll have to look through a bunch of data, and the smart guys -- the engineers and crew chiefs -- will probably point some of that stuff out to me. But, yeah, every time I looked at the tracker, the cars that were fast in 1 and 2 weren't in 3 and 4, and we were the opposite. We were really good in 3 and 4… but we'll take it either way."

Qualifying results

Practice (post-qualifying)

Second practice

Final practice

Race

Stage 1
Brad Keselowski led the field to the green flag at 3:48 p.m. He pulled away from Martin Truex Jr. in the opening laps, but Truex started reeling him back in around lap 12. The first caution of the race flew on lap 18 when Corey LaJoie slammed the wall in Turn 2. He went on to finish last. Truex exited pit road with the race lead.

The race restarted on lap 25. Keselowski, restarting on the outside lane, powered by Truex on the backstretch to take back the lead on the restart. Exiting the tri-oval, Kevin Harvick suffered a right-front tire blowout and slammed the wall, bringing out the second caution on lap 68. After leaving the infield care center, he said that the tire "started vibrating about four or five laps there before it blew out, and I was just trying to ride it to the end of the stage there. Obviously, it didn’t make it.” Joey Logano opted not to pit and took the lead.

The race restarted on lap 75. Truex, on four new tires, passed Logano with ease on the backstretch to retake the lead. He won the first stage and the third caution flew for the conclusion of the stage. Truex decided to stay out, having pitted under the previous caution.

Stage 2
The race restarted on lap 88. It settled into a green run that was interrupted by a cycle of green flag stops beginning on lap 125. Truex pitted from the lead the following lap. Keselowski pitted from the lead the next lap. Ty Dillon pitted from the lead on lap 129 and handed the lead to Michael McDowell. Truex passed McDowell in Turn 1 to cycle back to the lead on lap 131. Kyle Busch was handed a pass through penalty for speeding on pit road.

The fourth caution flew on lap 152 when Derrike Cope spun out in Turn 2. Jimmie Johnson inherited the lead after electing not to pit.

The race restarted on lap 156. Truex, on four new tires, passed Johnson with ease exiting Turn 2 on the restart to retake the lead. He won the second stage and the fifth caution flew for the conclusion of the stage.

Final stage

The race restarted with 100 laps to go. Kurt Busch made an unscheduled stop with 66 to go to make a battery change. Truex pitted with 57 to go and Johnson took the lead. He stayed out for 17 laps hoping for a caution, but didn't get one, pitted with 40 to go and Truex regained the lead. Keselowski passed Chase Elliott for second with 34 to go and set his sights on Truex. He passed Truex in Turn 3 to retake the lead with 23 to go. The sixth caution flew with 16 to go when Danica Patrick's engine expired on the frontstretch. She said her team "got the car to a place where I [thought] we could have got a little more racy with it, especially if we would have caught some breaks, but then it just flattened out. I just rode around the top in case I blew up, but having a teammate behind me was not ideal for the timing of it, but unfortunately it happened. We'll just move on.” The leaders all pitted under the caution and Keselowski remained the leader.

The race restarted with nine to go. Keselowski pulled away on the restart and had the win in check, but suffered a part failure with two to go and dropped off pace. Truex passed him on the backstretch and scored the victory.

Final lap and brawl
On the final lap, Keselowski's car fell back through the field. Kyle Busch veered to the bottom to avoid him and made contact with Logano. In Turn 3, Logano got loose, hit Busch and sent him spinning through Turn 4 and down onto pit road. Busch got out of his car, proceeded to the staging area where the top-five cars are captured after the race, usually at the entrance of pit road, threw a punch at Logano and a brawl broke out on pit road. It lasted roughly 18 seconds before officials broke it up.

Logano said after everything settled down that there wasn't much talking as "swinging," and that he was just "racing hard there at the end with our Pennzoil Ford. Kyle and I usually race really well together. We usually never have any issues, and he tried to pin me down into the corner underneath Brad and we about crashed on entry, and then I was still trying to gather it up by the center and I was gonna spin out, so I’m trying to chase it up and he was there. It obviously wasn’t anything intentional, but obviously he thinks that, so, I don’t know, we’ll get by.”

Busch saw it differently, telling Vince Welch of Fox Sports that he "got dumped. (Logano) flat-out just drove straight in the corner and wrecked me. That's how Joey races, so he's going to get it."

Post-race

Driver comments
Truex said in victory lane that his team "definitely had [their] share of races where we've dominated and gave one away, and it looked like today was going to be another one of those. The runs just didn't work out the way we needed them. We were struggling on the really long runs. We had to run that last set of tires on that last caution longer than we did all race long. From Lap 211 until caution for Danica Patrick's blown engine on Lap 252, I was out of control and Brad was really good on the long run. I hate that he had problems. He was strong and we weren't going to do anything with him, but then he lost the brakes or something. A little bit of a gift, but we've given some away, so it feels good to come out on the good end for once."

Keselowski, who finished fifth, said his team will "have to take [the car] apart (to discover the source of the part failure), it has to go through inspection. I just know it was something major. It wouldn't turn, and I lost the brakes, so it's a pretty good indicator.”

Race results

Stage results

Stage 1
Laps: 80

Stage 2
Laps: 80

Final stage results

Stage 3
Laps: 107

Race statistics
 Lead changes: 6 among different drivers
 Cautions/Laps: 6 for 34
 Red flags: 0
 Time of race: 2 hours, 56 minutes and 39 seconds
 Average speed:

Media

Television
Fox Sports covered their 17th race at the Las Vegas Motor Speedway. Mike Joy, 2001 race winner Jeff Gordon and Darrell Waltrip had the call in the booth for the race. Jamie Little, Vince Welch and Matt Yocum handled the pit road duties for the television side.

Radio
PRN had the radio call for the race which was also simulcasted on Sirius XM NASCAR Radio. Doug Rice, Mark Garrow and Wendy Venturini called the race in the booth when the field raced through the tri-oval. Rob Albright called the race from a billboard in turn 2 when the field raced through turns 1 and 2. Pat Patterson called the race from a billboard outside of turn 3 when the field raced through turns 3 and 4. Brad Gillie, Brett McMillan, Jim Noble and Steve Richards worked pit road for the radio side.

Standings after the race

Drivers' Championship standings

Manufacturers' Championship standings

Note: Only the first 16 positions are included for the driver standings.

References

2017 in sports in Nevada
2017 Monster Energy NASCAR Cup Series
March 2017 sports events in the United States
NASCAR races at Las Vegas Motor Speedway